Hernando Benito Perez (born September 27, 1939), also known as Nani Perez and colloquially as Nani, is a Filipino lawyer, academic, and a former politician who is currently serving as the President of the University of Batangas. He previously served in the Arroyo administration as the Secretary of Justice, and as the Secretary of Transportation and Communications under former President Corazon Aquino.

Life and education 
Perez was born on 1939 in Batangas. He studied law at Ateneo de Manila University and was admitted to the bar in 1962.

Career

Political career

Provincial politics (1980-1984) 
Perez is a lawyer by profession, but is a law professor. He was elected and became a member of the Batangas Provincial Board from 1980 to 1984.

Regular Batasang Pambansa (1984-1986) 

After his tenure on the Batangas Provincial Board expired in 1984. He served as Mambabatas Pambansa from June 1984 until March 1986, when Corazon Aquino became the president in February 1986 and the provisional government was put into place in March 1986.

Transportation department (1986-1987) 
He served as Minister of Transportation and Communications after President Corazon Aquino succeeded President Ferdinand Marcos through EDSA Revolution.

Congress (1987-1998) 
After his stint as secretary, Perez ran for Congress, then eventually won. From 1987 to 1998, He became the minority leader and have served as deputy speaker until his term end.

Justice department (2001-2003) 
After President Joseph Estrada was overthrown by his own Vice President Gloria Macapagal Arroyo through EDSA II. Perez was appointed as Secretary of Justice and served from 2001 to 2003. During his stint as justice secretary, the former head of the Commission on Audit and former Solicitor General Jose Calida served as undersecretary to him.

Post political career (2003-present)

President of the University of Batangas 

In 2007, he took over as president of the university until his brother Abelardo Perez's demise. His brother served in this capacity until his tragic passing on April 18, 2007.

Attempts to return to the House of Representatives 

In 2016, Perez ran for representative of the newly created 5th district. He placed third and lost to then-board member Mario Vittorio Mario, garnering 15,951 votes (10.52% of the total votes).

See also 
 University of Batangas

References 

1939 births
20th-century Filipino lawyers
Living people
Heads of government agencies of the Philippines
People from Batangas
Arroyo administration personnel
21st-century Filipino lawyers